The 2012–13 College of Charleston Cougars men's basketball team represented the College of Charleston during the 2012–13 NCAA Division I men's basketball season. The Cougars, led by first year head coach Doug Wojcik, played their home games at the TD Arena and were members of the South Division of the Southern Conference. They finished the season 24–11, 14–4 in SoCon play to finish in second place in the South Division. They advanced to the championship game of the SoCon tournament before falling to Davidson. They were invited to the 2013 College Basketball Invitational where they lost in the first round to George Mason.

This was the Cougars final season as a member of the SoCon as they joined the Colonial Athletic Association beginning with the 2013–14 season.

Roster

Schedule

|-
!colspan=9| Exhibition

|-
!colspan=9| Regular season

|-
!colspan=9| 2013 SoCon tournament

|-
!colspan=9| 2013 College Basketball Invitational

References

College of Charleston Cougars men's basketball seasons
College of Charleston
College of Charleston
Charleston
Charleston